Petro Mirchuk (1913–1999) was a Ukrainian writer living in the United States and a leading member of the Organization of Ukrainian Nationalists. 

Mirchuk headed the OUN's propaganda apparatus in 1939. He was an activist of the Bandera faction of OUN (known as OUN-B). During World War II, he was imprisoned in Auschwitz, Mauthausen, and other concentration camps. He entered the United States as a displaced person after the war. He authored several books about the OUN and UPA, and wrote the first biography of Stefan Bandera.

References

External links
Biography
Obituary

1913 births
1999 deaths
American people of Ukrainian descent
Ukrainian writers
Auschwitz concentration camp survivors
Soviet emigrants to the United States